Orfeu is a 1999 Brazilian romantic drama film directed by Carlos Diegues, and starring Toni Garrido, Patrícia França and Murilo Benício. Based on the play Orfeu da Conceição by Vinicius de Moraes, the film retells the Greek legend of Orpheus and Eurydice, setting it in the modern context of Rio de Janeiro during Carnival.

Mostly shot in scenographic favela in Jacarepaguá, Rio de Janeiro, it included scenes from the 1998 Carnival celebration in which Garrido paraded with the samba school Viradouro.

Cast
Toni Garrido as Orpheus
Patrícia França as Eurydice
Murilo Benício as Lucinho
Zezé Motta as Conceição
Milton Gonçalves as Inácio
Isabel Fillardis as Mira
Maria Ceiça as Carmen
Stepan Nercessian as Pacheco
Maurício Gonçalves as Pecê

Reception
It won the 1st Grande Prêmio Cinema Brasil for Best Film, Best Cinematography and Best Score. It was also the Brazilian submission to the 2001 Academy Award, but it did not enter the competition.

See also
 Black Orpheus (Orfeu Negro), 1959 film adapted from the same source material
 List of submissions to the 72nd Academy Awards for Best Foreign Language Film
 List of Brazilian submissions for the Academy Award for Best Foreign Language Film

References

External links
 

1999 drama films
1990s fantasy drama films
1999 films
Brazilian fantasy drama films
Films set in Rio de Janeiro (city)
Films shot in Rio de Janeiro (city)
Brazilian films based on plays
Films based on classical mythology
Films directed by Carlos Diegues
Orpheus
1990s Portuguese-language films